Mireille and the Others is a 1979 Belgian drama film written and directed by Jean-Marie Buchet. It was entered into the 11th Moscow International Film Festival.

Cast
 Sylvain Bailly as Jacques
 Yvonne Clech as Mère de Jacques
 Chantal Descampagne as Edwige
 Jean-Pierre Dougnac as Père de Jacques
 Alain Lamarque as Alphonse
 Michel Lechat as Oscar
 Tatiana Moukhine as Germaine
 Eric Schoonejans as Sylvain
 Véronique Speeckaert as Mireille

References

External links
 

1979 films
1979 drama films
Belgian drama films
1970s French-language films